The following people are known for their scholarly contributions to the ethnomusicology of the music of Africa:
V. Kofi Agawu (born 1956), professor of music and African and African-American studies at Harvard; studied music of the Ewe people of Ghana
Paul Berliner (born 1946), won ASCAP Deems Taylor Award for his ethnomusicology book on the Zimbabwean mbira
John Blacking (1928–1990), earned doctorate at University of the Witwatersrand for his work on Venda children's songs
Akin Euba (born 1935), composer and ethnomusicologist of West African music, founded the theory of African pianism
Arthur Morris Jones (1889–1980), early 20th century missionary who published two-volume Studies in African Music
Gerhard Kubik (born 1934), author of books on the theory of African music and on the African roots of American music
Alan P. Merriam (1923-1980), author of African Music in Perspective
Joseph Hanson Kwabena Nketia (born 1921)
Andrew Tracey (born 1936)
Hugh Tracey (1903–1977), founding director of the International Library of African Music
Colin Turnbull (1924–1994)

References

Ethnomusicology